Death in the Haymarket is a 2006 popular history book on the Haymarket affair, written by James Green.

Bibliography

External links 

 

2006 non-fiction books
English-language books
Works about the Haymarket affair
History of anarchism
Pantheon Books books
American history books